Rob Davies may refer to:

Rob Davies (footballer) (born 1987), Welsh professional footballer
Rob Davies (politician) (born 1948), South African politician
Rob Davies (table tennis) (born 1984), Welsh table tennis player

See also
Robert Davies (disambiguation)
Rob Davis (disambiguation)